Rae Perlin (September 11, 1910 – March 5, 2006) nurse and artist born in St. John's, Newfoundland, best known for her sketches and her work as an impressionist style painter.

Biography
Perlin, was born on September 11, 1910, the youngest of six children of Adelle (Adams) and Israel Perlin. She was educated at Bishop Spencer College in St. John's and a private school in Ontario. She left for New York at an early age to study nursing. She graduated from nursing school in 1934 and worked as a nurse during the Great Depression and the World War II. Her passion was not nursing but art,  eventually studying with Samuel Brecher and Hans Hofmann.

Perlin moved to Paris in 1950 to study at Académie de la Grande Chaumière and Académie Ranson to further her art studies. From there she moved to London to study at the Polytechnic of Central London. In 1959 she moved back to St. John's to care for her ailing mother. While back at her birthplace she worked at the St. John's General Hospital, still not liking that profession.

Perlin's work is displayed in art galleries and in 1994 she was the subject of a biography, Not A Still Life, by Mariam Francis White. Perlin joined the Baháʼí Faith in 1969, the fourth native Newfoundlander to do so.

Perlin died on March 5, 2006, at St. John's after a long struggle with Alzheimer's disease.

See also
 List of people of Newfoundland and Labrador

References

External links
 Bio at Art Gallery of Newfoundland and Labrador
 News item at the Baháʼí Community of Canada Website

1910 births
2006 deaths
Deaths from Alzheimer's disease
Neurological disease deaths in Newfoundland and Labrador
Pre-Confederation Newfoundland and Labrador people
People from St. John's, Newfoundland and Labrador
Alumni of the University of Westminster
Canadian women painters
Artists from Newfoundland and Labrador
20th-century Canadian painters
20th-century Canadian women artists